This is a list of equipment of the British Army currently in use. It includes small arms, combat vehicles, aircraft, watercraft, artillery and transport vehicles. The British Army is the principal land warfare force of the United Kingdom, a part of British Armed Forces. Since the end of the Cold War, the British Army has been deployed to a number of conflict zones, often as part of an expeditionary force, a coalition force or part of a United Nations peacekeeping operation.

To meet its commitments, the equipment of the Army is periodically updated and modified. Programs exist to ensure the Army is suitably equipped for both current conflicts and expected future conflicts, with any shortcomings in equipment addressed as Urgent Operational Requirements (UOR), which supplements planned equipment programmes.

Infantry section equipment

The British infantry section consists of eight soldiers who are normally organised into two four-soldier infantry fireteams. While equipment formations can be tailored as required by section and platoon commanders, infantry sections are usually issued with the following:

 Weapons
 Six L85A2/A3 rifles, two of which are usually equipped with an L123A2/A3 underslung grenade launcher (UGL)
 One L129A1 sharpshooter rifle
 One L7A2 general purpose machine gun (can be replaced by an additional L85A2/A3 rifle at commanding officer's discretion for a total of seven L85A2/A3 rifles)
L3A1 bayonet; one for each L85A2/A3 and L129A1 rifles in the section.
 One L128A1 combat shotgun for use by the section point soldier (point position is subject to rotation between individual members of the section)
 Two NLAW anti-tank weapons
 L72A9 or L2A1 anti-structure munitions
 L109A2 high explosive grenades
 L132A1 smoke grenades and/or L84A3 red phosphorus smoke grenades

 Vision systems
 Sight Unit Small Arms, Trilux (SUSAT) or SpecterOS Lightweight Day Sights (LDS)
 Advanced Combat Optical Gunsight (ACOG) to be used with the L129A1 rifle
 Image intensified Common Weapon Sights
 Laser Light Module Vario Ray Adaptive Target Acquisition Modules
 TAM-14 small Thermal Imaging System
 Head mounted Night Vision System (HNVS), based on the American AN/PVS-14.
 VIPIR-2+ thermal imaging weapon sights
 Commander's target locating systems (CTLS)

 Communications equipment
 Personal Role Radio (PRR) – one issued to each member.
 Bowman Combat Net Radio - secure HF, VHF, UHF voice and data communications. The MoD plans to replace Bowman with a system named Morpheus in the future. 
 Falcon - joint tactical trunk communications system for the Land Environment. 
 Reacher - is a mobile X-Band Satellite Ground Terminal that uses the Skynet V military satellite network
 Small SATCOM - the satellite ground terminal is reasonably lightweight, transportable within an airframe and can be set up by a single trained operator in less than 30 minutes, also using the Skynet V network. 
 Skynet - is a family of military communications satellites, they provide strategic and tactical communication services to the branches of the British Armed Forces, the British intelligence agencies, some UK government departments and agencies, and to allied governments including the Five Eyes intelligence alliance members (Australia, Canada, New Zealand, the United Kingdom and the United States).

Weapons

Pistols

Infantry rifles

Bayonet

Long range rifles

Submachine guns

Machine guns

Shotguns

Grenade launchers

Explosives

Indirect fire weapons

Portable anti-material weapons

Personal equipment

Protective equipment

Helmet

Many soldiers are now equipped with the new Virtus helmet (Revision Batlskin Cobra Plus) which provides increased blunt impact protection, has a lighter weight than the preceding Mk7, can be fitted with face and mandible guards for certain roles, is specially shaped to allow effective weapon usage while in a prone position and wearing body armour, and features a permanent universal night vision mount and a scalable counterweight attached to the helmet's rear in order to ease strain on the user's neck while a night vision device is equipped.

Prior to this, the standard helmet in service was the Mk7 which replaced the older Mk6 and Mk6A helmets on operations. The Mk7 helmet offered the same protection as the Mk6A but had a lower weight and was equipped with a new harness that kept the helmet more stable on the head when night vision equipment was fitted. The shape of the helmet was better integrated with new weapon sights compared to the Mk6A, making it easier to use in a variety of fighting positions. All helmets allow the soldier to wear a respirator, hearing protection, goggles and/or a radio headset as necessary. 84,000 Mk 7 helmets were donated to the Ukrainian military in 2014.

Combat body armour

The British Army utilises three combat body armour systems. Enhanced Combat Body Armour, a soft body armour vest that was first introduced in the 1980s and can be augmented with hard armour plates, was used on operations until the introduction of the Osprey body armour series in 2006 and was then relegated to training activities for which it remains in use; additionally, the hard armour plates were repurposed for use as Osprey body armour's side protection component. Osprey body armour, constituting a MOLLE vest that can carry both soft body armour inserts and front, rear, and side hard body armour plates with the option of adding neck and deltoid protection, went through several iterations with the last of these being the Mk 4 and Mk 4A 'Osprey Assault' vests; these provide the same level of ballistic protection as older models while improving the comfort of the wearer by being closer fitting, less bulky, and easier to move in, with the Mk 4A version achieving a further weight reduction by switching from a cummerbund to a smaller side plate pouch. The hard armour plates, which were made thinner to further increase mobility and comfort, are carried in internal pockets as opposed to the external pockets of Enhanced Combat Body Armour and earlier Osprey vests. A ribbed material lining on the inside of the Mk 4 vests improves breathability in hotter climates such as that of Afghanistan. Both Mk 4 vests have a higher number of MOLLE loops compared to earlier versions and introduced new pouches such as a "commander's pouch" for holding stationery and open magazine pouches with elastic draw-cords for easier access to ammunition (though conventional pouches with Velcro flaps and Fastex fastenings were also included).

Osprey Mk 4 and Mk 4A body armour has mostly been replaced by the Scalable Tactical Vest component of Virtus body armour, which is even lighter and closer-fitting and can have its level of protection more closely scaled to the prevailing threat type. The vest also features a quick-release mechanism to aid safe extraction from hazardous situations such as burning vehicles or drowning and a dynamic weight distribution system which, when linked to a soldier's waist belt, aids in spreading the soldier's load across the back, shoulders, and hips; a mechanism in the small of the back allows the wearer to adjust the weight bias depending on the situation.

Ancillary to regular body armour is a three-tier pelvic armour system issued since 2010 to mitigate against shrapnel and other blast effects. The first layer is a pair of underwear shorts manufactured from a ballistic silk material. The second layer consists of detachable pelvic body armour that is intended to be worn while 'outside the wire' to meet the greater threats faced by soldiers on patrol; it can be rolled up and clipped to a belt and then pulled through the legs to form a protective pouch, ensuring that mobility is not impeded while worn. The third layer consists of knee-length ballistic shorts worn over a soldier's combat trousers, offering coverage of the upper leg and wider abdominal region and designed for use by soldiers operating hand-held metal detectors to search for explosive devices or otherwise serving in a combat role where greater levels of protection are required.

Respirator

By January 2015, over 300,000 General Service Respirators had been delivered to replace the older S10 respirator. These respirators are also used by the Royal Navy, Royal Air Force and Royal Fleet Auxiliary.

Uniforms

Boots

In 2012, the MOD purchased a newly designed range of brown combat boots from Haix, Alt-Berg, and other manufacturers for the Army, Royal Navy and RAF to replace the black and desert combat footwear previously worn. Five different types of boots, developed to match the Multi-Terrain Pattern uniform, are available to Armed Forces personnel depending on where they are based and what role they are in. Each of the five types comes in two different styles, with personnel being able to wear the particular style they find most comfortable. Black boots have been retained for wear with most non-camouflage uniforms as well as units on parade in full dress uniform, such as regiments performing ceremonial duties in central London.
 Desert Combat – worn by dismounted troops conducting medium to high levels of activity in desert type environments with temperatures exceeding 40 °C
 Desert Patrol – worn by drivers/armoured troops conducting lower levels of activity in desert type environments exceeding 40 °C
 Temperate Combat – worn by dismounted troops for medium to high levels of activity in temperate (European) climates
 Patrol – worn by mounted troops (drivers/armoured troops) taking part in lower levels of activity in temperate (European) climates
 Cold Wet Weather – worn by dismounted troops for medium to high levels of activity in temperatures down to −20 °C.

Before the adoption of the brown boots, British troops were issued with desert combat boots manufactured by Meindl and Lowa for use in Afghanistan. Both boots remain listed as part of the MOD's 'Black Bag' of operational clothing despite their official replacement by the brown boots, and may be worn by individual soldiers in lieu of the issue footwear.

Personal Role Radio

A Personal Role Radio (PRR) is distributed to every member of an eight-strong infantry section.

Load carrying equipment

Personal Load Carrying Equipment (PLCE), officially known as 95 Pattern Webbing, is the current non-MOLLE webbing system used to carry ammunition, food and water, protective equipment, and other individual supplies. The webbing consists of a belt, a yoke harness, and various belt pouches, as well as two daysacks for use with the Combat Order; these can be attached to a larger 'Bergen' rucksack for use with the Marching Order. Associated with PLCE is a series of similar load carrying equipment and rucksacks. PLCE webbing is capable of holding everything that a soldier needs to operate for 24 hours without resupply in its Fighting Order, for up to two or three days without resupply in its Combat or Patrol Order and for up to two weeks without resupply in its Marching Order.

The Osprey body armour series, the later Virtus scalable tactical vest, and various items associated with either system all feature MOLLE loops for direct attachment of load carrying pouches, thus obviating the need for the earlier PLCE webbing. However, PLCE sets have been manufactured in the newer MTP camouflage pattern, and both this webbing and earlier DPM webbing (due to basic durability and the quantity produced) continues to see usage during training exercises and, more rarely, on operations.

Future Integrated Soldier Technology

The Future Integrated Soldier Technology (FIST) is a programme under development by the Ministry of Defence. The programme is designed to achieve enhanced military effect through the use of advanced technologies improving the situational awareness, lethality and survivability of soldiers. Ultimately, the programme is part of the wider British Armed Forces doctrine of network-enabled capability. 35,000 sets of kit are expected to be bought and issued between 2015 and 2020. This equipment is designed to bring the British infantryman up to standards and link with new technology currently employed, including the new underslung grenade launcher for the SA80 and the deployed Bowman communications network. It is not intended that every soldier be equipped with FIST: instead, unit commanders will request FIST kits as necessary so that they can be tailored to the situation and mission aims.

Vehicles

Armoured

Artillery and air-defence

Mobile artillery monitoring battlefield radar

The Mobile Artillery Monitoring Battlefield Radar (or Mobile Artillery Monitoring Battlefield Asset) is a counter-battery radar. It detects enemy artillery projectiles fired by one or more weapons and from their trajectories locates the position of the weapon that fired it. It has a detection range of up to 30 km and can process up-to 100 projectiles simultaneously. It is mounted on a Bandvagn 206 (Bv206) all-terrain vehicle. Five vehicles are operated by the 5th Regiment Royal Artillery.

Exactor

The Exactor is a previously classified purchase of the Rafael Spike-NLOS missile system. The system is primarily used for precise indirect counter barrage attacks at long ranges where the GMLRS would result in too much collateral damage. It originally consisted of six Mk2 or Mk4 missiles mounted on an M113 chassis, of which 12 were purchased directly from the Israeli Defence Force with a further two chassis leased.

In 2010, the United Kingdom hired Rafael to produce an improved Mk 5 missile and also ditched the M-113 based launchers as they were poorly air-conditioned and difficult to keep running. These new missiles were mounted on a simpler flatbed trailer containing four missiles each. This new system was dubbed the Exactor 2 by the U.K. Ministry of Defence. 18 such systems now exist within the Royal Artillery in six batteries of three.

Centurion

Centurion is a C-RAM system based on the 20mm Phalanx CIWS, originally acquired for use in Basra, Iraq, and were later used in Afghanistan. It was operated by 16th Regiment Royal Artillery, and intended to intercept incoming rockets, shells and mortars out to a 1.2 km square area. They are maintained by Babcock International in the United Kingdom. A total of ten sets were purchased in 2005, but since then four have been reconverted back to the maritime variant. Centurion has been out of service since 2015.

Engineering and logistics

Miscellaneous

C vehicle fleet

The job of the Royal Engineers is to restrict the enemy's ability to advance, while also allowing friendly combat forces the freedom to maneuver as necessary. Other tasks undertaken are bomb disposal, the construction of fortifications, runways, roads and bridges and the improvement of existing infrastructure to support operations – such as improving existing roads for logistic convoys. To achieve this, the Royal Engineers operate a large and diverse fleet of vehicles. At present, the C vehicle fleet is provided by a private finance initiative (PFI) and consists of some 2,500 vehicles of over 160 types of "earthmoving plant, Engineer Construction Plant (ECP) and rough terrain Materials Handling Equipment (MHE)".

The provider of the PFI is Amey Lex Consortium (ALC), which was awarded a 15-year contract in 2005 for £600 million. The handing over of the C vehicle fleet to a PFI has improved overall efficiency, with ALC selecting common chassis for multiple roles and significantly reducing equipment types. This has led to reduced training needs in personnel, commonality of spares and an overall reduction in the logistic footprint and cost of maintenance. ALC maintains the fleet at various degrees of readiness, with a large pool of the vehicles being modified and adapted for military use – however, the majority of the fleet is maintained at commercial standards. The fleet is dispersed worldwide to accommodate both existing and future operations. When in use, the vehicles are essentially being "hired on an ad hoc basis". To help sustain the C vehicle fleet on operations, the PFI includes a logistics support package.

All-terrain vehicles

There are a number of all-terrain vehicles in service with the British Army. The Supacat ATMP is a lightweight 6×6 used by airborne and air-mobile forces. It can carry up to 8 troops with a standard NATO pallet of stores and ammunition. The Springer all-terrain vehicle is a light-role 4×2 load carriage platform, which can self-load a 1-ton pallet. Each vehicle is equipped with an 8,000 lb (3,600 kg) self-recovery winch and sand ladders, which act as loading ramps for a cargo pallet. Approximately 900 Grizzly 450 quad bikes are used as light transport for things such as mortars, ammunition and general supplies. Finally, the Harley Davidson MT350E and Honda R250 motorcycles are used by dispatch riders and for a variety of liaison and traffic control tasks.

Special forces
The Special forces maintain a unique fleet of vehicles to support their covert operations. In 2001, 65 Supacat High Mobility Transporter (HMT) 400 vehicles were ordered under Project Minacity after being in development for a special forces protected vehicle requirement since the late 1990s. The Minacity vehicles entered service in 2003 in Afghanistan. In 2008, 24 Australian Bushmaster armoured vehicles were purchased under an UOR for the SAS in Iraq, as these provided all-round protection unlike the Minacity. It is fitted with additional armour, counter-IED electronics, and a .50 calibre machine gun mounted in a RWS. In addition, other vehicles known to be in service are: 60 Toyota Hilux for special forces mobility; and 78 ACMAT VLRAs as tactical support vehicles to resupply and sustain special forces on operations. In August 2016, the BBC reported that the Jankel Toyota Land Cruiser-based Al-Thalab long range patrol vehicle was being used in Syria.

Aircraft

|-
| AgustaWestland Apache || United Kingdom || Rotorcraft || Attack || 2004 || 42 || 50 ||  To be replaced by the AH-64E Apache Guardian in 2024
|-
| Boeing AH-64E Guardian || United States || Rotorcraft || Attack || 2020 || 2 || 2 ||  A total of 50 aircraft are on order to replace the Apache AH1. 
|-
| AgustaWestland AW159 Wildcat || United Kingdom || Rotorcraft || Utility || 2014 || 34 || 34 || 
|-
| Bell 212 || Canada || Rotorcraft || Utility || 1995 || 3 || 3 ||  Flown in Kenya by No. 25 Flight AAC, in support of TTB and BATUK
|-
| Eurocopter AS365 Dauphin II || France || Rotorcraft || Utility || 2009 || 6 || 6 || Six aircraft are in use with No. 658 Squadron AAC in support of 22 SAS. Two are in use with the Fleet Helicopter Support Unit (FHSU) for the Royal Navy.
|-
| Thales Watchkeeper WK450 || United Kingdom || UAV || ISR || 2014 || 49 || 50 || 
|-
| Westland Gazelle || United Kingdom || Rotorcraft || Patrol || 1974 || 26 || 34 ||  Expected  2025. Two additional units are currently undergoing work to bring them back into service
|}

Watercraft

Raiding craft

The raiding craft in service with the British Army are operated in large numbers, predominately with the Royal Engineers and the Royal Logistic Corps, for supporting both bridging and amphibious operations. These craft are highly versatile and often find themselves serving in environments ranging from the Arctic to the tropics.

Mk.4 Workboat
Four boats in service, operated by the Royal Logistic Corps as small tugs and general purpose work-boats in support of amphibious operations. They have a displacement of 48 tonnes and a maximum speed of 10 knots.

Mexeflotes

Mexeflotes are amphibious landing raft operated by the Royal Logistic Corps for amphibious operations and are designed to deliver both armoured vehicles and material from ship to shore. They are deployed on the 16,160 tonne Bay-class landing ships of the Royal Fleet Auxiliary.

Future equipment

 'The Future Integrated Soldier Technology is a suite of equipment capable of enhancing an infantryman's effectiveness as part of the Future Soldier program.
 The Scout SV known as "Ajax" in British service and its variants have been chosen to replace the CVR(T) family of vehicles. Ajax was due to go operational in 2019, however the first were delivered in early 2021. Issues have arisen around the Ajax platform and the project is currently (June 2022) under review.
 The MoD has a requirement for a new multi role vehicle under the Multi Role Vehicle-Protected. At DSEI 2015 General Dynamics UK announced that they would offer variants of their Ocelot (Foxhound) and Eagle vehicles for the requirement. In July 2017, the US DSCA notified the US Congress of a possible sale of 2,747 JLTV vehicles and accessories to the UK. As of Oct 2019 no decision had been made.
The British Army wants to purchase 8x8 wheeled armoured fighting vehicles to replace the Mastiff and Ridgeback in British Service. This program used to be part of FRES UV, later named simply UV (Utility Vehicle) and now known as Mechanised Infantry Vehicle (MIV). This vehicle is intended to equip the 4 "heavy protected mobility" battalions under Army 2020 Refine. They will also be part of the two Strike Brigades proposed under the Strategic Defence and Security Review 2015. In 2018 the UK rejoined the Boxer AFV consortium and as of Oct. 2019 are in negotiations with a view to purchasing 500+ units. On 5 November 2019, it was announced that a £2.8 billion deal for 500 Boxer armoured vehicles had been signed. Deliveries would start in 2023.
Senior army officers and procurement officials are looking at either upgrading the Challenger 2 or outright replacing it. At DSEI 2015, army officials expressed their concern with the Challenger 2's armament and its inevitable obsolescence in coming years. Other causes of concern are the Challenger's engine and electronics. The army stated that they had been in discussions with armoured fighting vehicle manufacturers about the future of the tank and its potential replacement. A later Defence News article said that the British Army would still proceed with its Challenger 2 LEP, citing that a replacement at the present would be too costly. On 22 December 2016, an assessment phase award was awarded to BAE Systems and Rheinmetall Land Systeme GmbH to progress the Challenger 2 Life Extension Project.
Under the Non-Articulated Vehicle – Protected (NAV-P) program, the MoD is looking for a successor to the DROPS vehicles. This has resulted in a contract placed in 2018 for the conversion of 382 MAN HX77 Support Vehicles to carry the EPLS (Enhanced Palletised Load System) equipment. They are due to fully enter service in March 2021. The contract includes the conversion of 33 winterised/waterproofed versions
The Army is currently in the process of receiving 56 Harris Corporation T7 EOD unmanned ground vehicles (UGV), procured by DE&S under Project Starter. These systems are due to fully enter service by December 2020, replacing the fleet of Wheelbarrow Mk.8Bs at the same time.
The British MOD released a Request for Information for the Mobile Fires Platform, a new 155mm self-propelled howitzer to support the Armoured Infantry and Strike Brigades.
A Prior Information Notice (PIN) was released for a successor to the Mobile Artillery Monitoring Battlefield Radar (MAMBA), Advanced Sound-ranging Post (ASP) and Counter-battery radar, all which will reach their out-out-service date in 2026.
In July 2019, the UK issued a PIN notice for Directed Energy Weapon (DEW) demonstrators which could be mounted on army vehicles.
 A Robotic Platoon Vehicle (RPV) was pitched at DSEI 2019.
 In July 2021, a requirement for Colt Canada C8 rifles to serve as an Alternative Individual Weapon (AIW) System for the new Army Special Operations Brigade was issued.

See also

Other equipment lists
List of communications and reconnaissance equipment of the British Army
List of equipment of the Royal Marines
Related articles
Royal Engineers bridging and trackway equipment
Unmanned systems of the British Army
Army 2020 Refine
List of British weapon L numbers

References

External links

British Army equipment
Equipment
British military uniforms
British Army
Post–Cold War military equipment of the United Kingdom
Army
Lists of military equipment